Thomas Paradiso (born December 7, 1979) is an American lightweight rower. He won a gold medal at the July 2008 World Rowing Championships in Ottensheim with the lightweight men's eight. At the August 2008 Summer Olympics, he came eleventh with the lightweight coxless four.

References

1979 births
Living people
American male rowers
World Rowing Championships medalists for the United States
Rowers at the 2008 Summer Olympics
Olympic rowers of the United States